Since 1994, the National Organization for Women (NOW) has presented the Woman of Courage Award annually (in most years) at the National NOW Conference, and periodically at issue-based summits organized by NOW and/or the NOW Foundation. Honorees are chosen for having demonstrated personal bravery in challenging entrenched power and in carrying out action that has the potential to benefit women in general.

Recipients of this award have been plaintiffs in lawsuits that challenged sex-based discrimination and pervasive sexual harassment. They have also been leaders who organized other women to promote better working conditions and opportunities in non-traditional careers, such as  New York firefighter Capt. Brenda Berkman. An awardee may be an individual who brought attention to an important issue through her own experience, such as Christy Brzonkala. After being raped by two football players at Virginia Tech, Brzonkala sued the university, and her case went all the way to the U.S. Supreme Court.

Another honoree was a young woman, Julia Gabriel, who took action to improve labor conditions by testifying against those who force illegal servitude. In a highly publicized case, future awardee Lilly Ledbetter took her case against sex-based pay discrimination by Goodyear Tire and Rubber to the Supreme Court at great personal cost. NOW also presents the Woman of Courage Award to women who have accomplished special or unique feats undertaken by few others, such as Barbara Hillary, who reached the North Pole at the age of 75.

See also

 List of awards honoring women

References

Awards honoring women
Lists of award winners
National Organization for Women
Courage awards